Paul Warren (born 28 October 1974) is a British actor. He is best known for playing characters wearing heavy prosthetic makeup and/or creature suits in such films as Star Wars: The Force Awakens (2015), Star Wars: The Last Jedi (2017), Guardians of the Galaxy (2014), Thor: The Dark World (2013), Clash of the Titans (2010), World War Z (2013), and Ghost Stories (2017)

Personal life 
Paul was born in Hillingdon, Middlesex, United Kingdom.

Career 
He began his film career in 2006 as a body double for Daniel Radcliffe on the film Harry Potter and the Order of the Phoenix (2007): "I spent much of my time 20ft up in the air on the hydraulic broomstick system and doing other physically demanding activities during the shoot, whilst building a good rapport with the cast/crew and a reputation as a versatile performer".

Later that same year, he was recommended to the legendary Stan Winston Studio as a good choice to portray an emaciated version of the title character (played by Mike Vogel) in The Deaths of Ian Stone. Crediting Winston and his team, he said, "This door opening into the world of acting under silicone and foam latex, is what ultimately led to a film career playing characters in heavy prosthetics and creature suits".

His first creature performing role was in 2009, where he played a tortured soul who pulls the boat across the river styx in the remake of Clash of the Titans.

In 2010, Paul was used as a visual effect double for skinny Steve Rogers in Captain America: The First Avenger. He was the original template for Skinny Steve in the pre-production VFX head replacement tests and was on set for the recruitment scene as a visual reference. Body double duties for the rest of production (which total about 5% according to director Joe Johnston) were performed by stage actor Leander Deeny.

On getting the role of Varmik, one of the Hassk triplet's in Star Wars: The Force Awakens, he says, "It felt very surreal. I wasn’t told what it was that I was being asked to go in for; only that the production was putting together a team of core creature performers for a film at Pinewood Studios.  I had been recommended to them by creature designer and makeup artist Martin Rezard, who I had worked with previously on Guardians of the Galaxy and Thor: The Dark World."

Varmik is of particular interest to Star Wars fans due to his origin: "The character is based on 2 classic pieces of Ralph McQuarrie's Star Wars production art from 1975. The cantina showdown and early Chewbacca designs. The former is a particular favorite of J. J. Abrams' that he wanted to bring to life on screen."

In Star Wars: The Last Jedi, Paul plays a Dowager alien in the Canto Bight casino.  The character created quite a buzz online when it was revealed by director Rian Johnson that the animatronic space pug it holds was based on Carrie Fisher's very own pet pooch Gary, affectionately known on set as Space Gary.

Occasionally he still steps out from behind the prosthetics, for example when he provided mime/movement for Steven Spielberg's Ready Player One (2018) and when he was a special action performer on Kingsman: The Secret Service (2014) for that stunning stunt scene in the church choreographed by the late great Brad Allan.

During the 2020 COVID-19 pandemic, Paul joined the cast and crew of the killer goblin film Unwelcome. As well as playing the Redcap goblin Mr Sniff, he also took on a new role of Creature Movement Coach for Nick Chopping's stunt team.

More recently Paul can be seen performing the character of Dr Quadpaw in the Star Wars television series Andor. Aidan Cook wore makeup to portray the character, while Paul Warren and Matt Lyons controlled the arms. He was also a Troll in episode 6, season 1 of the tv series Willow. Both produced by Lucasfilm.

Filmography

Film

Television

References

External links 
 
 
 Paul Warren on Twitter
 Paul Warren on Facebook
 Paul Warren on Instagram

British male television actors
British male film actors
1974 births
Living people